Marijana Ribicic (born 21 February 1979) is a former Croatian female volleyball player. She was part of the Croatia women's national volleyball team.

She competed with the national team at the 2000 Summer Olympics in Sydney, Australia, finishing 7th.

See also
 Croatia at the 2000 Summer Olympics

References

External links
 
 
 
 

1979 births
Living people
Croatian women's volleyball players
People from Vukovar-Srijem County
Volleyball players at the 2000 Summer Olympics
Olympic volleyball players of Croatia